Porthdinllaen Lifeboat Station (Welsh Gorsaf Bad Achub Porthdinllaen) is a Royal National Lifeboat Institution (RNLI) operated lifeboat station in the coastal village of Porthdinllaen, within the community of Dwyfor on the Llŷn Peninsula, Gwynedd, North Wales

History
In the 19th century, North Wales lacked good roads, and so the sea was the easiest way to access many places. Porthdinllaen, on the northern coast of the Llŷn peninsula, with its sheltered north facing bay, became important as a harbour of refuge and a busy port, with over 700 ships passing through the port in 1861.

On the night of 2/3 December 1863, 18 ships that had been sheltering in Porthdinllaen bay were driven ashore and wrecked. Robert Rees of Morfa Nefyn tied a rope around his waist and, with the help of 4 other men, succeeded in saving 28 lives. For his gallantry on that occasion, Rees was awarded the Bronze Medal from the Board of Trade and the Thanks on Vellum by the RNLI.

After storms subdued, the Reverend Owen Lloyd Williams, Vicar of Boduan, wrote to the RNLI in London to ask for a lifeboat station to be established at Porthdinllaen. After an inspection of the area in February 1864 by Captain J.R. Ward, and his fully supporting recommendation report, the establishment of a lifeboat station was approved by the RNLI on 3 March 1864.

The proposal was to establish both a stone boat house and stone slipway, and to protect the structure to allow safe launching of the lifeboat from the prevailing westerly winds through creation of a protective seawall. After accepting an estimate of £140 for the works, local contractors were engaged. Instead of building a new lifeboat, the RNLI proposed to move and reallocate the existing lifeboat at Sea Palling in Norfolk, England. Built in 1858 as a 30 ft × 7 ft 6inch, 10-oared self-righter, after sailing to a boatyard in London she was altered and lengthened to a 36 ft × 8 ft, 12-oared self-righter at a cost of £198.

Conveyed from London to Caernarfon free of charge by the London & North Western Railway, she was then sailed south to Porthdinllaen, arriving on 26 August 1864. The boat was made possible by a donation of £250 by Lady Cotton-Sheppard (née Elizabeth Cotton of Thornton Hall, Oxfordshire), the third that she had underwritten. The boat hence was named Cotton Sheppard in a ceremony conducted by new vicar, The Rev. John Hughes who also became the station's Honorary Secretary, on 9 September 1864. The first coxswain was his brother Hugh Hughes.

Operations
Manned constantly since its opening, Porthdinllaen Lifeboat Station is the only lifeboat station where Welsh is the normally spoken language of the crew. The coxswain, as of 2014, is Mike Davies, who has served as coxswain since 2004.

The Tyne class lifeboat Hetty Rampton, in service since 27 April 1987, was replaced by a new Tamar class lifeboat John D Spicer. Funded by a bequest within the will and by agreement with the executors of the estate of John Dominic Spicer of Oxfordshire, who died in October 2010, the new boat was temporarily kept on a mooring while work to build a new boathouse was undertaken.

Due to the size and scale of the new boat, a new lifeboat house and slipway was constructed with much improved crew and workshop facilities, at a cost of £8 million. This became operational in April 2014. Originally due to start construction in Spring 2011, due to access concerns of the local population and the costs of realignment of a track along the cliff top via the Nefyn and District Golf Club, the RNLI determined that the new boathouse would be constructed with materials delivered by sea. This was the method used in 2006–2008 for construction of the new £5.5million boathouse for the Tenby Lifeboat Station.

Among the awards received by the crew over the years are one silver and three bronze RNLI medals for bravery, the last awarded in 1981.

In 2013 S4C broadcast a 6-part series (called Bad Achub Porthdinllaen) showing a year in the life of the Porthdinllaen lifeboat.

Visitor access
This station is classed as an Explore lifeboat station by the RNLI, for those lifeboat stations which aim to offer the best visitor experience. It is accessible to the public, including to see the lifeboat and visit the RNLI gift shop. When not on call, the station offers free access in the summer months, and pre-booked tours in the winter.

Fleet

See also
 Royal National Lifeboat Institution

Notes

References

External links

 
 Lifeboat Station @ RNLI

Lifeboat stations in Wales
Buildings and structures in Gwynedd
1864 establishments in Wales
Organisations based in Gwynedd
Nefyn
Transport infrastructure completed in 1864